Mariana R. Pfaelzer (February 4, 1926 – May 14, 2015) was a United States district judge of the United States District Court for the Central District of California.

Education and career

Born to a Jewish family in Los Angeles , California in 1926, Pfaelzer received an Artium Baccalaureus degree from the University of California, Santa Barbara in 1949 and a Juris Doctor from the UCLA School of Law in 1957. She was in private practice in Los Angeles from 1957 to 1978.

Federal judicial service

On August 8, 1978, Pfaelzer was nominated by President Jimmy Carter to a seat on the United States District Court for the Central District of California vacated by Judge Francis C. Whelan. She was confirmed by the United States Senate on September 22, 1978, and received her commission the next day. She was the first female federal judge appointed to the district. She assumed senior status on December 31, 1997, serving in that status until her death.

Notable cases

She is noted for her role in striking down California's Proposition 187, which would have denied services to undocumented immigrants in California. Pfaelzer handed down a $600 million judgment against Countrywide Financial.

Death and tributes

On May 14, 2015, Pfaelzer died in Los Angeles after serving on the federal bench for nearly 40 years. George H. King, the Chief District Court Judge for the Central District of California, noted that she "was the epitome of what a federal judge ought to be . . . presi[ding] with brilliance, analytical rigor, practicality, wisdom, grace and courage."

Personal

Pfaelzer was married to Frank Rothman, an attorney who died in 2000.

See also
 List of first women lawyers and judges in California

References

Sources
 

1926 births
2015 deaths
People from Los Angeles
Judges of the United States District Court for the Central District of California
United States district court judges appointed by Jimmy Carter
20th-century American judges
University of California, Santa Barbara alumni
UCLA School of Law alumni
20th-century American women judges